Judith Ann Bennett (born 1944) is a New Zealand historian. She has been emeritus professor at the University of Otago since 2019.

Academic career

Bennett wrote a 1979 PhD thesis at Australian National University titled,  'Wealth of the Solomons: a history of trade, plantations and society, Solomon Islands, c.1800–1942'  studying the colonial history of the Solomon Islands and has spent much of her career researching, writing and teaching about the Pacific and its history.

Bennett has received two Marsden grants, the first to research the children of American servicemen and pacific women and the second to research the history of the coconut and its trade.

Selected works 
 Bennett, Judith A. Wealth of the Solomons: A history of a Pacific archipelago, 1800–1978. Vol. 3. University of Hawaii Press, 1987.
 Bennett, Judith. Roots of conflict in Solomon Islands-though much is taken, much abides: legacies of tradition and colonialism.  State, Society and Governance in Melanesia, Discussion Paper 2002/5, Australian National University, Canberra 2002, (2002).
 Bennett, Judith A. Pacific forest: A history of resource control and contest in the Solomon Islands C. 1800–1997. Brill, 2000.
Bennett, J. A. with Russell, K. J. (eds), Journeys in a Small Canoe: the life and times of a Solomon Islander, Lloyd Maepeza Gina, Canberra, Pandanus Press, ANU (2003), 300 p.
Bennett, Judith A. Natives and exotics: World War II and environment in the Southern Pacific. University of Hawaii Press, 2009
Bayliss-Smith, T and J.A.Bennett (eds),(2012). An Otago storeman in Solomon Islands: The diary of William Crossan, copra trader, 1885–86. Canberra, Australia: ANU E Press, 95p. 
Bennett, J. A. (Ed.). Oceanian journeys and sojourns: Home thoughts abroad. Dunedin, New Zealand: Otago University Press, (2015) 408p.
Bennett, J.A. and Wanhalla, A (eds)  Mothers' Darlings of the South Pacific: the children of Indigenous Women and US Servicemen in World War Two, Honolulu: University of Hawaii Press and Dunedin: University of Otago Press. 2016. 379 p
 Bennett, J. A. (2018) Pacific Coconut: Comestible, Comfort and Commodity, Journal of Pacific History, 53: 4, 353–37;
 Bennett, J. A. (2018) Voices of Rotuma: Enduring refrain, Journal of Pacific History, 53: 4, 502–520;
 Bennett, J. A. (2017) Fluid frontiers and uncertain geographies: US controls on immigration from the Pacific (c. 1880–1950), Journal of Pacific History, DOI:10.1080/00223344.2017.1406319;
 Bennett, J. A. (2013) Meditations: new directions in the study of the decolonization of Melanesia. Journal of Pacific History, 48: 3, 323–329.
 Bennett, J. A. (2013) Introduction to Pacific Research Protocols at the University of Otago, The Contemporary Pacific, 25 (1), 95–124,

References

External links
  
 

Living people
20th-century New Zealand historians
Australian National University alumni
Academic staff of the University of Otago
1944 births
New Zealand women historians
21st-century New Zealand historians